Dardanelles Cone is a mountain peak in the Carson-Iceberg Wilderness on the Stanislaus National Forest.  It lies near Sonora Pass in the Sierra Nevada of California. It is between State Route 4 and State Route 108.

The Dardanelles Cone consists of volcanic material dating back millions of years. It stands out in contrast to the forested and more recently arrived granite landscape around it.

References

External links 
 
 

Mountains of Alpine County, California
Mountains of the Sierra Nevada (United States)
Stanislaus National Forest
Mountains of Northern California